Lindgren Road is a north-south boulevard in Miami-Dade County, Florida. It is also known as Northwest 137th Avenue and Southwest 137th Avenue, as laid out in the Miami-Dade street grid. The road also carries two segments of the State Road 825 (SR 825) designation. An additional  segment extends southward from Miami Executive Airport to Homestead.

Route description
State Road 825 begins at the intersection of Southwest 137th Avenue and Southwest 128th Street, near the entrance of the Miami Executive Airport. SR 825 heads north, with the airport in unincorporated Miami-Dade County to the west and commercial business in the CDP of Three Lakes to the east of the road. At Southwest 120th Street, SR 825 exits the airport property, and drives through residential housing for most of the rest of this section. Prior to the 1990s, most of this route was surrounded by farmland. It then intersects Southwest 104th Street, the former State Road 990, continuing north through residential housing.  At Southwest 90th Street, commercial businesses take over the landscape of SR 825 for the last two blocks until it terminates at the intersection of State Road 94, the only state road that this section of SR 825 intersects.

Based on the current grid method of numbering Florida State Roads, SR 825 is incorrectly numbered. In Band 9, of the state, SR 825 lies further west than SR 985 (Southwest 107th Avenue north of SR 94) and SR 989 (Southwest 112th Avenue south of US 1), and lies east of SR 997 (Krome Avenue). Based on the roads location and nearby route numbers, Lindgren Road would normally merit a designation of State Road 993.

In 2022, two new sections were opened the northern section between SR 994 (SW 200 ST, Quail Roost Drive) and SW 240 ST, and the southern section between SW 248 ST and U.S. Route 1 (South Dixie Hwy) to directly connect all sections of the road from SW 344 ST to NW 25 ST

History

The Florida Department of Transportation added the route in the early 1980s in a campaign to increase access to the county's commercial airports. In 2009, the northern segment was adopted and widened to cater to motorists coming off the newly built western extension of the Dolphin Expressway.

Major intersections

References

External links

825
825